Guido Antonio Arcimboldi (1428–1497) was a nobleman and a Roman Catholic prelate.

Life

Born in Parma, son of Nicolò and Orsina Canossa, he studied law and since young age he was in friendship with Galeazzo Maria Sforza. In his young age Arcimboldi married an unknown woman that give him four child. In his career Arcimboldi was a loyal diplomats in behalf of the house of Sfroza the rulers of the Duchy of Milan. In 1469 he was named lord of Pandino and in 1484 lord of Arcisate. In 1488 after the death of his brother the archbishop Giovanni he was selected as Archbishop of Milan. At the time of his elevation to archbishop Guido Antonio's wife was dead. During his tenure as archbishop Guido Antonio left many of his pastoral duties as archbishop to the auxiliary bishops Giacomo de Bydgoszcza and Paolo da San Ginesio anyway there are evidence that Arcimboldi did some pastoral works in his archdiocese.
Guido Antonio Arcimboldi died in 1497.

References 

1428 births
1497 deaths
Archbishops of Milan
Nobility from Parma
15th-century Italian Roman Catholic archbishops
Religious leaders from Parma